The 5th Annual NFL Honors was the awards presentation by the National Football League honoring its best players from the 2015 NFL season. It was held on February 6, 2016 and aired on CBS in the United States at 9:00 PM EST. Comedian Conan O'Brien hosted the show.

List of award winners

References

NFL Honors 005
2015 National Football League season
2016 in American football
2016 in sports in California
2016 in San Francisco
American football in the San Francisco Bay Area
2016 sports awards